Gonzalo Fernández may refer to:
Gonzalo Fernández of Castile, Count of Burgos (ca. 899-915) and of Castile (c. 909-915)
Gonzalo Fernández de Traba (died 1160), Galician nobleman
Gonzalo Fernández de Córdoba (1453–1515), known as el Gran Capitán, Castilian general and statesman
Gonzalo Fernández de Córdoba (1585–1635) (1585–1645), Spanish military leader
Gonzalo II Fernández de Córdoba (1520–1578) (1520–1578), 3rd duke of Sessa
Gonzalo Fernández de Oviedo y Valdés (1478–1557), Castilian writer and historian
Gonzalo Fernández de Córdoba (1585–1635), Spanish military leader
Gonzalo Fernández (Uruguayan politician) (born 1952), Foreign Minister of Uruguay 2008–2009
Gonzalo Fernández de la Mora (1924–2002), Spanish essayist and politician
Gonzalo Fernández-Castaño (born 1980), Spanish golfer
Gonzalo Fernández Parrilla, Spanish scholar and translator of Arabic literature